The 1996 Men's World Outdoor Bowls Championship  was held at the Lockleys Bowls Club in Adelaide, Australia, from 18 to 31 March 1996.

The 1996 Women's World Outdoor Bowls Championship was held at Victoria Park, Leamington Spa, England from 3 to 18 August 1996.

Medallists

Results

Men's singles – round robin
Section A

Section B

Section C

Section D

Finals

Men's pairs – round robin
Section A

Section B

Section C

Section D

Finals

Men's triples – round robin
Section A

Section B

Section C

Section D

Finals

Men's fours – round robin
Section A

Section B

Section C

Section D

Finals

Women's singles – round robin
Section A

Section B

Bronze medal match
 Lindores bt  Jones 25-4

Gold medal match
 Anderson bt  Line 25-9

Women's pairs – round robin
Section A

Section B

+ Replacement

Bronze medal match
 Fiji bt  South Africa 28-17

Gold medal match
 Ireland bt  Jersey 21-19

Women's triples – round robin
Section A

Section B

Bronze medal match
 Wales bt  England 17-14

Gold medal match
 South Africa bt  Australia 19-12

Women's fours – round robin
Section A

+ Replacement

Section B

Bronze medal match
 England bt  New Zealand 24-21

Gold medal match
 Australia bt  South Africa 18-15

Taylor Trophy

References

World Outdoor Bowls Championship
1996 in Australian sport
World Outdoor Bowls Championship
Bowls in Australia
Sports competitions in Adelaide
1990s in Adelaide
March 1996 sports events in Australia